John Standish Fforde (16 November 1921 – 10 April 2000) was a British economist who was active in the Bank of England between 1957 and 1984. As Chief Cashier between 1966 and 1970, his signature appeared on British Bank Notes. After retirement he became the Bank of England's official Historian, and wrote The Bank of England And Public Policy, which covered the years 1941 to 1958.

In 1951 John Fforde married Marya Retinger, the daughter of Austro-Hungarian (later, Polish) political adviser Joseph Retinger, and a granddaughter of journalist E. D. Morel. They have three sons and one daughter, including novelist Jasper Fforde.

Fforde's work Bank of England's History: The Bank of England And Public Policy (1941–1958) was published in 1992.

Posts held

Prime Minister's Statistical Branch 1951–1953
Fellow, Nuffield College, Oxford 1953–1956
Staff, Bank of England 1957–1984
Deputy Chief, Central Banking Information Department 1959–1964
Adviser to the Governors 1964–1966, 1982–1984
Chief Cashier 1966–1970
Executive Director (Home Finance) 1970–1982
Official historian to the Bank of England, 1984–1992

Publications

The Federal Reserve System, 1945–49 (1953)
The Bank of England and Public Policy 1941–1958 (1992)

References

2000 deaths
1921 births
People educated at Rossall School
Chief Cashiers of the Bank of England
20th-century  British economists
Alumni of Christ Church, Oxford
Fellows of Nuffield College, Oxford
People from Dorset
20th-century English businesspeople